Ephydrolithus is a Neotropical genus of water scavenger beetle in the family Hydrophilidae represented by five described species known from Brazil.

Taxonomy 
The genus Ephydrolithus was described for the first time by Girón & Short in 2019.

It belongs in the subfamily Acidocerinae and contains three described species from Brazil (Bahía, Minas Gerais).

Description 
Small beetles (1.8–3.3 mm), yellowish-brown to dark brown in coloration, with relatively short maxillary palps. A complete diagnosis was presented by Girón and Short.

Habitat 
According to Girón and Short "All known species are exclusively associated with rock seepages".

Species 

 Ephydrolithus hamadae Girón and Short, 2019
 Ephydrolithus minor Girón and Short, 2019
 Ephydrolithus ogmos Girón and Short, 2019
 Ephydrolithus spiculatus Girón and Short, 2019
 Ephydrolithus teli Girón and Short, 2019

References 

Hydrophilidae
Insects of South America
Insects described in 2019